Lisi (also Romanized as Līsī) is a village in Sajjadrud Rural District, Bandpey-ye Sharqi District, Babol County, Mazandaran Province, Iran. At the 2006 census its population was not reported.

References 

Populated places in Babol County